Corrie Erickson, alt spelling "Erixon" (born 1981) in Northfield, Minnesota is an oil painter, graphic designer, and Illustrator. Erickson created numerous Illustrations for the actor and comedian Patton Oswalt, including the "Patton's 3rd Army" poster in 2005, as well as a similar design for fellow comedian and actor Zach Galifianakis. Erickson also studied under the commercial artist John Berkey.

Erickson's paintings and illustrative works are often images of landscapes, hot rod culture, pin-up, and military themes and genres.

The United States Air Force 104th fighter squadron has used Erickson's Pin-up art for its Fairchild Republic A-10 Thunderbolt II Fighter Jets, stationed in Kandahar Airfield, Afghanistan. Erickson has been associated with the rejuvenation of "Bomber Pin Up" in the modern age, as reflected in the bomber pin-up art of World War Two.

Erickson created the logo for the city of Northfield, Minnesota.

See also

Lowbrow (art movement)

References

American artists
1981 births
Living people